Hugh of Beaulieu (died 1223) was a medieval English Bishop of Carlisle.

Life
Hugh was the first abbot of the Cistercian Beaulieu Abbey, which had originally been located at Faringdon in Berkshire (now Oxfordshire), before he was selected for the see of Carlisle. In 1214 and 1216, Hugh was censured by the Chapter General of the Cistercian Order for the ostentation of his lifestyle. He was accused of eating off silver plate, keeping a guard dog in his bedroom with a silver chain, and of too much revelry with earls and knights. While abbot, he attended the Fourth Lateran Council in 1215. He had been deposed as abbot before he was chosen as bishop, at some point shortly before 1218. He was elected about 1 August 1218, and consecrated on 24 February 1219. He was not the choice of the cathedral chapter of Carlisle, and his election was forced on them. He died on 4 June 1223.

Citations

References

Further reading

 

English abbots
Bishops of Carlisle
13th-century English Roman Catholic bishops
Year of birth missing
1223 deaths
People from Faringdon
People from New Forest District